The KP m/44, nicknamed "Peltiheikki" or "Pelti-kp", which could be translated as "sheet-metal Heikki" and "sheet-metal machine pistol"/"sheet-metal submachine gun" respectively, was a Finnish 9mm copy and modification of the Soviet mass-produced 7.62 mm submachine gun PPS-43.

History
Starting in 1942, and becoming more common as the Finnish-Soviet Continuation War progressed, both PPS-42 and PPS-43 began showing up among Soviet units, and many were captured by the Finnish Army. The simple construction of these weapons immediately caught the interest of the Finnish arms industry. It was decided that they would try to copy the sheet-steel stamped construction process, but redesigned to use the 9×19mm Parabellum round instead of the original Soviet 7.62×25mm Tokarev and to use the magazine of the Suomi KP/-31 submachine gun, the standard SMG in Finnish service at that time. The new submachine gun was a much cheaper design than the Suomi submachine gun and could be manufactured much faster. All parts were made out of stamped steel (excluding the barrel, bolt and the wood hand grips). The weight of the gun was almost halved compared to the Suomi (2.95 kg vs. 5 kg).

The Finnish Defence Forces ordered 20 000 m/44 submachine guns from Tikkakoski in August 1944. The end of the war saw the order reduced to 10 000 units and the guns were produced during 1945. It is unlikely the m/44 actually saw action during WWII but the gun was used by the Finnish Defence Forces as a training weapon until the 1970s. The Finnish Border Guard and United Nations troops also used the weapon, the latter particularly during the Suez Crisis.

Willi Daugs, Tikkakoski Oy's principal shareholder, took the blueprints with him to Spain after World War II. The gun was produced there at the Oviedo arms factory, who re-designated it DUX-53. In 1953, the West German border guards (Bundesgrenzschutz) adopted the Spanish-made DUX-53 and DUX-59 submachine guns, copied from the PPS-43 by way of the Finnish M/44.

Users

References

Bibliography
 Palokangas, Markku: Sotilaskäsiaseet Suomessa 1918-1988 osa II ja III
 Sotatieteen laitos: Talvisodan historia 1
 Erjola, Risto: Asetuotanto Suomessa toisen maailman sodan aikana
 Harvila, Lauri: Suomen armeijan käyttämät aseet
 Timo Hyytiäinen: Arma Fennica 2, Gummerus, Jyväskylä, 1987

External links
 

9mm Parabellum submachine guns
Submachine guns of Finland
World War II submachine guns
Weapons and ammunition introduced in 1945